Virgil Akins (March 10, 1928 – January 22, 2011) was an American boxer who won the Welterweight Championship of the World in 1958. Nicknamed ‘Honeybear’, Akins was the first World Champion boxer from St. Louis.

Career
Akins was born and died in St. Louis, Missouri.

Akins was considered lanky, but proved nevertheless to be a powerful hitter with either hand. He began his career as a Lightweight in 1948, continuing to fight in that division for 6 years before finally growing into the Welterweight class. He was long considered to be an effective operator and boasted wins over future World Champions Joe Brown and Wallace ‘Bud’ Smith, as well as ending the incredible forty-seven fight winning streak of Ronnie Delaney, by way of knock-out in 1955.

Akins had powered his way up the rankings in both divisions and finally got his chance of a World title once Carmen Basilio relinquished the Welterweight Championship to concentrate on defending his new Middleweight crown. An elimination tournament including six of the World's top-rated Welterweights was swiftly established in an effort to find Basilio's successor. Akins emerged the victor and new World Champion on June 6, 1958, by pounding favourite Vince Martinez to a fourth round destruction. All told, Martinez went down nine times, having never seriously recovered from a shattering right delivered early in the First.

Akins's reign would not last long however. Six months later, he lost his title to Don Jordan by way of unanimous decision and in only his first defense. Akins disputed the result but fared no better in the return, held the following Spring. From that moment on, it was downhill all the way for the former champion, who would win just ten of his last twenty-three fights before hanging up his gloves in 1962.

Akins's contract was "owned" under the table by the notorious  Frank "Blinky" Palermo, a member of the Philadelphia crime family. Palermo was imprisoned in 1961 for conspiracy and extortion for the covert ownership of prizefighters.

Akins died at the age of 82 on January 22, 2011.

Professional boxing record

Honors
 Named The Ring magazine Progress of the Year fighter for 1958.
 Elected to the Gateway Classic Walk of Fame

See also
List of welterweight boxing champions

References

External links
 
 https://titlehistories.com/boxing/na/usa/ny/nysac-wl.html
 https://boxrec.com/media/index.php/National_Boxing_Association%27s_Quarterly_Ratings:_1958
 https://boxrec.com/media/index.php/National_Boxing_Association%27s_Quarterly_Ratings:_1959
 Biographical Information from: (i) The Ring Record Book & Boxing Encyclopedia, 1959 (Nat Fleischer, The Ring Book Shop Inc., 1959). See p. 4. (ii) STL Today .
 Details of Akin's Ring Record from: (i) The Boxing Records Archive . (ii) The Cyber Boxing Zone .

1928 births
2011 deaths
Boxers from St. Louis
Welterweight boxers
American male boxers